Hélio José de Souza Gonçalves (born 31 January 1986), commonly known as Hélio, is a Brazilian-born Hong Kong professional football player who plays as a centre back for Hong Kong Premier League club Kitchee.

Hélio acquired his HKSAR passport on 31 October 2015, which means he is eligible to represent Hong Kong on the international level.

Club career

Early career
He was transferred from Sántos B to Ceará SC for an unknown fee in the January transfer window of the 2006–07 season, and was then transferred to Olímpia SP for an unknown fee in the January transfer window of the next season without playing a single game for Ceará. He played 20 games for Olímpia, scoring 2 goals. He was then sold to Citizen in Hong Kong in the summer transfer window 6 months later for an unknown fee.

Citizen
He played a total of 118 league games for Citizen, scoring 10 goals in his 6-year stay at the club. He won the HKFA Senior Challenge Shield once with the club. He left the club for Kitchee in the summer transfer window of 2014.

Kitchee
He has played a total of 82 league games for Kitchee thus far, scoring a single goal, and has won the HKPL and the HKFA League Cup twice with the team, and has won the Season play-offs and Senior Challenge Shield once with Kitchee. He also completed the treble with the team in the 2016–17 season.

On 27 March 2018, Hélio suffered an injury in a crucial Asian Cup qualifier against North Korea and was substituted in the 11th minute. The injury left him out of action for nine months until he returned on 16 December as a late substitute against Hoi King.

Career Statistics

Club 
As of 22 May 2021

International

Honours

Club
Citizen
Hong Kong Senior Shield: 2010–11

Kitchee
Hong Kong Premier League: 2014–15, 2016–17, 2017–18, 2019–20
Hong Kong FA Cup: 2014–15, 2016–17, 2017–18, 2018–19
Hong Kong Senior Shield: 2016–17, 2018–19
Hong Kong Sapling Cup: 2017–18, 2019–20
Hong Kong League Cup: 2014–15, 2015–16
Hong Kong Community Cup: 2016–17, 2017–18
AFC Cup Play-off: 2015–16

References

External links

1986 births
Living people
Hong Kong footballers
Hong Kong international footballers
Brazilian footballers
Brazilian emigrants to Hong Kong
Association football defenders
Citizen AA players
Kitchee SC players
Hong Kong First Division League players
Hong Kong Premier League players
Naturalized footballers of Hong Kong
Hong Kong League XI representative players
People from Ribeirão Preto
Footballers from São Paulo (state)